Stefan Marini (born 23 June 1965) is a retired Swiss football defender and later manager.

References

1965 births
Living people
Swiss men's footballers
FC Luzern players
FC Aarau players
Swiss Super League players
Association football defenders
Switzerland international footballers
Swiss football managers
FC Thun managers
SC Kriens managers